The M/V Quiberon was a ferry operated by Brittany Ferries between 1982 and 2002. She then operated on the Mediterranean for Euroferrys under the name Guila D'Abundo. In 2010, she was renamed D'Abundo and sent to Alang for scrapping.

Routes served
Plymouth-Santander, Plymouth-Roscoff and Roscoff-Cork 1982-1989
Plymouth-Roscoff, with winter sailings on Portsmouth/Plymouth-St Malo as well, 1989-2002
Portsmouth-Caen 2002

1992 Fire

Quiberon hit the front pages of the national papers with an engine room fire in July 1992 which claimed the life of one crew member. Crossing from Plymouth to Roscoff on 17 July with 1,034 passengers aboard, the ship put out an emergency call which resulted in British and French air sea rescue helicopters scrambling to the ship's aid. The fire was extinguished by the ship's own crew before land-based assistance could come aboard, but passengers were mustered and lifeboats swung out as a precaution. Quiberon remained out of service for much of the rest of the summer season, not reappearing from repairs until the end of August. As a result of this fire, the ship received some rather unflattering newspaper headlines.

From her launch and throughout her service with Brittany Ferries her Port of Registry was Stockholm.

Onboard facilities
Facilities available on board the Quiberon included 2 cinemas, 2 restaurants, a Salon de Thé, 4 shops and more than 280 cabins. She received a full renovation prior to entering service in 1982 and another one in 1990.

Statistics
Gross tonnage: 11,813
Length: 129 m
Beam: 21.06 m
Speed: 20 knots
Crew: 100
Cars: 260
Passengers: 1,302

References

Ferries of the United Kingdom
1975 ships
Ferries of France